Alison Downie (born 17 July 1984) is an Australian sportswoman most notable for her career as a basketball player for the Dandenong Rangers in the Women's National Basketball League. Downie is a retired Australian rules footballer, who played for Carlton and Collingwood in the AFL Women's (AFLW) competition.

Basketball
Downie began her professional basketball career in 2000, for the Dandenong Rangers. Since then, Downie has played 326 WNBL games in 16 seasons for the Rangers. She won three WNBL championships and took home the WNBL Rookie of the Year Award in 2002. She has been a strong, permanent member of the Rangers roster for over a decade. Downie retired from WNBL basketball at the end of 2015/16 due to time commitments, but has not retired from the sport entirely.

Australian rules football
Downie began playing Australian rules football for Diamond Creek in the Victorian Women's Football League (VWFL) in the basketball off-seasons from 2012. After gaining particular attention as one of the league's best rucks in the 2016 season, she was drafted by Carlton for the inaugural AFL Women's competition in 2017. She made her league debut in the club and the league's inaugural match in round 1, 2017. At the end of the season, Downie was listed in the 2017 All-Australian squad.

Carlton signed Downie for the 2018 season during the trade period in May 2017.

In June 2021, Downie was delisted by Carlton and was subsequently signed by Collingwood as a delisted free agent.

In March 2023, Downie announced her retirement from Australian football.

AFLW statistics
 Statistics are correct to the end of the S7 (2022) season

|- 
! scope="row" style="text-align:center" | 2017
|
| 30 || 7 || 2 || 0 || 33 || 17 || 50 || 15 || 16 || 89 || 0.3 || 0.0 || 4.7 || 2.4 || 7.1 || 2.1 || 2.3 || 12.7 || 0
|-
! scope="row" style="text-align:center" | 2018
|
| 30 || 7 || 3 || 0 || 24 || 22 || 46 || 15 || 11 || 45 || 0.4 || 0.0 || 3.4 || 3.1 || 6.5 || 2.1 || 21.6 || 6.4 || 0
|- 
! scope="row" style="text-align:center" | 2019
|style="text-align:center;"|
| 30 || 9 || 2 || 0 || 33 || 61 || 94 || 13 || 18 || 179 || 0.2 || 0.0 || 3.6 || 6.7 || 10.3 || 1.4 || 2.0 || 19.9 || 1
|- 
! scope="row" style="text-align:center" | 2020
|style="text-align:center;"|
| 30 || 7 || 1 || 0 || 20 || 25 || 45 || 14 || 10 || 69 || 0.1 || 0.0 || 2.9 || 3.6 || 6.5 || 2.0 || 1.4 || 9.9 || 2
|- 
! scope="row" style="text-align:center" | 2021
|style="text-align:center;"|
| 30 || 9 || 1 || 0 || 18 || 31 || 49 || 6 || 14 || 42 || 0.1 || 0.0 || 2.0 || 3.4 || 5.4 || 0.7 || 1.6 || 4.7 || 0
|- 
! scope="row" style="text-align:center" | 2022
|style="text-align:center;"|
| 30 || 11 || 1 || 0 || 33 || 57 || 90 || 13 || 19 || 155 || 0.1 || 0.0 || 3.0 || 5.2 || 8.2 || 1.2 || 1.7 || 14.1 || 0
|- 
! scope="row" style="text-align:center" | (2022)
|style="text-align:center;"|
| 30 || 9 || 0 || 0 || 30 || 22 || 52 || 7 || 18 || 144 || 0.0 || 0.0 || 3.3 || 2.4 || 5.8 || 0.8 || 2.0 || 16.0 || 
|- class="sortbottom"
! colspan=3| Career
! 59
! 10
! 0
! 191
! 235
! 426
! 83
! 106
! 723
! 0.2
! 0.0
! 3.2
! 4.0
! 7.2
! 1.4
! 1.8
! 12.3
! 3
|}

References

External links

Profile at WNBL

1984 births
Living people
Australian women's basketball players
Carlton Football Club (AFLW) players
Australian rules footballers from Melbourne
Guards (basketball)
Victorian Women's Football League players
Collingwood Football Club (AFLW) players
People educated at Mentone Girls' Grammar School